The Estadio Municipal de Santo Domingo is a football stadium located in Alcorcón, Community of Madrid, Spain. It is currently the home ground of AD Alcorcón. Owned and operated by the municipality, its first match dates from 19 May 1999, with the celebration of a friendly fixture with Real Madrid.

References

External links 
Estadios de España 

Football venues in the Community of Madrid
AD Alcorcón
Sports venues completed in 1999
Buildings and structures in Alcorcón
1999 establishments in Spain